Chulalongkorn Bridge is a three-span railway bridge in Thailand crossings Mae Klong River. It is situated in Mueang Ratchaburi District, Ratchaburi Province, on the Southern Line Railway and paralleled to Thanarat Bridge. The bridge is named after King Chulalongkorn.

Local people always calls Chulalongkorn Bridge in the name Saphan Dam (สะพานดำ), that refers to Black Bridge.

History
Chulalongkorn Bridge had been bombed by the Allied aircraft during World War II many times. Up to the present, under the Mae Klong River there are still many bombs from that era and the remains of steam locomotive.

Features
It is a three-span truss bridge, each span of length 49.9 meters.

See also
Saphan Chulalongkorn Halt: an adjacent railway halt

References

Railway bridges in Thailand
Bridges completed in 1901
Truss bridges